SMNC may refer to:

 Super Monday Night Combat, a 2012 third-person shooter video game
 Survival of motor neuron centromeric, a gene involved in the assembly of snRNPs